The New York State Monument is a large monument at the Gettysburg National Cemetery in Pennsylvania. The granite and marble monument was dedicated in 1893 honors the soldiers from New York who died at the Battle of Gettysburg during the American Civil War. It was commissioned by the New York Monuments Commission and designed by sculptor Caspar Buberl, with some additional bronze-works designed by Maurice J. Power.

History

Background and creation 
During the American Civil War, over 475,000 soldiers in the Union Army were from the state of New York, more than any other state. Many New York soldiers participated in the Battle of Gettysburg, and New York constitutes the largest state group in the Gettysburg National Cemetery. Following the war, the state erected many monuments and memorials honoring their soldiers who died in the battle. In the late 1800s, the government of New York appropriated US$50,000 for the erection of a large monument in the cemetery. The New York Monuments Commission, headed by former Union General Daniel Sickles, solicited designs from several prominent sculptors, offering $500 for the winning design and $300 and $200 for the second and third place entries, respectively. Sculptor Caspar Buberl, who was well-known at the time for his military monuments, was selected to design the monument. Construction on the monument was underway by 1891. The stonework was executed by the Hallowell Granite Works, while the Henry-Bonnard Bronze Company cast the bronze-works. New York City-based sculptor Maurice J. Power was contracted to design some of the bronze pieces on the monument. H. A. Zabriskie, an assistant to General Sickles, served as the directing engineer for the overall project. The monument was dedicated on July 2, 1893. According to the New York Monuments Commission, the total cost for the monument was $59,095.30.

Later history 
In 1995, the monument was surveyed as part of the Save Outdoor Sculpture! project. In mid-2011, the statue at the top of the monument was repaired and cleaned, and in June of the following year, the monument underwent steam-cleaning and a coating of protective wax was added to the bronze pieces.

Design 
The monument is primarily in the form of a victory column, modeled after Trajan's Column, topped by a bronze statue. It is one of the tallest monuments at the site, even exceeding the height of the Soldiers' National Monument. The statue at the top is of a woman, resembling one of the women found in the Coat of arms of New York, holding flowers for the dead in one hand and a staff in the other.

"NEW YORK" is inscribed on the front of the monument's base, while a bronze plaque affixed to the front bears the following inscription: "TO THE OFFICERS AND SOLDIERS / OF THE / STATE OF NEW YORK / WHO FELL IN THE / BATTLE OF GETTYSBURG JULY 1,2,3, 1863 / MANY OF WHOM ARE HERE BURIED. / THIS MONUMENT IS / ERECTED BY A GRATEFUL COMMONWEALTH", in addition to a listing of casualties. A plaque on the rear of the base bears the names of officers from the state who died at Gettysburg. A number of Corps Badges are also present on the base. Above the base, wrapped around the start of the column is a ring of bronze tablets that depict four scenes from the battle: the wounding of General Daniel Sickles, the wounding of General Winfield Scott Hancock, the death of General John F. Reynolds, and a war council convened by General Henry Warner Slocum. Above this bronze imagery is another bronze ornament, composed of the seal of New York, battle flags, and an eagle.

Gallery

See also 
 List of monuments of the Gettysburg Battlefield

Notes

References

Sources

Further reading

External links 
 

1893 establishments in Pennsylvania
1893 sculptures
Bronze sculptures in Pennsylvania
Gettysburg Battlefield monuments and memorials
Granite sculptures in Pennsylvania
New York (state) in the American Civil War
Outdoor sculptures in Pennsylvania
Sculptures of women in Pennsylvania
Union (American Civil War) monuments and memorials in Pennsylvania